Peter Bichsel (born 24 March 1935) is a popular Swiss writer and journalist representing modern German literature. He was a member of the Gruppe Olten.

Bichsel was born 1935 in Lucerne, Switzerland, the son of manual labourers. Shortly after he was born, the Bichsels moved to Olten, also in Switzerland. After finishing school, he became an elementary school teacher, a job which he held until 1968. From 1974 to 1981 he was the personal advisor and speech writer of Willy Ritschard, a member of the Swiss Federal Council. Between 1972 and 1989 he made his mark as a "writer in residence" and a guest lecturer at American universities. Bichsel has lived on the outskirts of Solothurn for several decades.

He started publishing short lyric works in newspapers. In 1960, he got his first success in prose as a private printer. In the winter of 1963-1964 he took part in writing course in prose taught by Walter Höllerer.

One of his first and most well-known works is And Really Frau Blum Would Very Much Like to Meet the Milkman. Just as successful, Children's Stories, intended for adults, is written in the form of droll tales for children. Both books were translated from the German by English poet Michael Hamburger. A theme of Bichsel's works for younger readers is the stubborn desire of children to take words literally and wreak havoc on the world of communicated ideas. In the early 1970s and 1980s, Bichsel's journalistic work pushed his literary work mainly into the background. Only Der Busant (1985) and Warten in Baden-Baden appeared again with the Bichsel style that was so familiar to German readers. Peter Bichsel gave up being a professional teacher early in his lifetime, yet he has continued to teach his readers that the drudgery and banality of life is of our own making. Conversely, we have every opportunity to prevent our lives from being boring. This theme has helped make Peter Bichsel a symbol of German literary work today.

In 1981, he was a member of the jury at the 31st Berlin International Film Festival.

Peter Bichsel's estate is archived in the Swiss Literary Archives in Bern.

Awards

1965 Prize of "Group 47"
1970 Deutscher Jugendbuchpreis
1981/82 Stadtschreiber von Bergen
1996 Mainzer Stadtschreiber
1999 Gottfried-Keller-Preis
2000  Prix Européen de l’Essai Charles Veillon
2000 Kassel Literary Prize
2004 Honorary Doctor of Theology, University of Basel
2005 Work grant by Pro Helvetia 
2011 Solothurner Literaturpreis
2012 Grosser Schillerpreis

Short story collections
Versuche über Gino (1960)
Eigentlich möchte Frau Blum den Milchmann kennenlernen (1964)
And really Frau Blum would very much like to meet the milkman. Translated by Michael Hamburger. London, Calder & Boyars (1968)
Die Jahreszeiten (1967)
Kindergeschichten (1969)
Des Schweizers Schweiz (1969)
Inhaltsangabe der Langeweile (Hörspiel, 1971)
Geschichten zur falschen Zeit (Kolumnen, 1979)
Der Leser (1982)
Schulmeistereien (1985)
Der Busant (récits, 1985)
Irgendwo anderswo (1986)
Möchten Sie Mozart gewesen sein ? (1990)
Im Gegenteil  (1990)
Zur Stadt Paris(1993)
To the city of Paris. Text German/English. Translated by Michael Kuttner. Kolkata, Tarjama (2007)
Gegen unseren Briefträger konnte man nichts machen.  (1995)
Die Totaldemokraten (1998)
Cherubin Hammer und Cherubin Hammer (1999)
Alles von mir gelernt  (2000)
Eisenbahnfahren (2002)
Doktor Schleyers isabellenfarbige Winterschule (2003)
Das süsse Gift der Buchstaben(2004)
Wo wir wohnen (2004)
Cherubin Hammer und Cherubin Hammer (2005)
Kolumnen, Kolumnen (2005)

Further readingPeter Bichsel. in: World authors, 1975-1980. Ed. Vineta Colby. New York: Wilson, 1985. 
 Rolf Jucker (ed.), Peter Bichsel. Cardiff: University of Wales Press, 1996. 

 References

External links
 Literary estate of Peter Bichsel in the archive database HelveticArchives of the Swiss National Library.
 Publications by and about Peter Bichsel in the catalogue Helveticat of the Swiss National Library
 Peter Bichsel at the Encyclopædia Britannica''.

1935 births
Living people
20th-century Swiss writers
Swiss male short story writers
Swiss short story writers
Members of the Academy of Arts, Berlin